Ernest Lewis "Tex" Vache (November 17, 1888 – June 11, 1953) was an American professional baseball player.

Biography
Vache was born November 17, 1888, in Santa Monica, California. It took him until the age of 36 to reach the Major Leagues. On April 16, Vache made his Major League debut for the Boston Red Sox. Throughout the year, Vache played 110 games.

His final game was September 22 that year; it was his only season in Major League Baseball, despite hitting .313 for the season.

Vache died 28 years later on June 11, 1953, in Los Angeles, California. He was 64 years old.

References
Tex Vache at Baseball-Reference

1888 births
1953 deaths
Major League Baseball outfielders
Boston Red Sox players
Baseball players from California
Beaumont Exporters players
American expatriate baseball players in Canada
Canton Terriers players
Charleston Pals players
Columbus Senators players
Dallas Steers players
Lincoln Links players
Milwaukee Brewers (minor league) players
Mission Bells players
Regina Senators players